The 1911–12 season was the 35th Scottish football season in which Dumbarton competed at national level, entering the Scottish Football League, the Scottish Cup and the Scottish Qualifying Cup.

Scottish League

Dumbarton were unable to maintain a bright start to their sixth successive Second Division campaign but finished 3rd with 27 points, 8 behind champions Ayr United.

At the end of the season there were no applicants from the Second Division for promotion. It had however been agreed that the bottom First Division club - St Mirren - would be replaced by the Second Division champions - Ayr United - but in the end for financial reasons this did not take place.

Scottish Cup

Qualification for the Scottish Cup was successful, however Dumbarton lost out in the first round to East Stirling.

Scottish Qualifying Cup
Dumbarton reached the final of the Scottish Qualifying Cup before losing to Dunfermline Athletic.

Friendlies/Other Matches
During the season 8 'friendly' matches were played, including a 'benefit' game for Herbert MacPherson whose bright career was ended by a leg break in the New Year game against Dundee Hibs.  In all, 6 were won, 1 drawn and 1 lost, scoring 17 goals and conceding 5.

Player statistics

Squad 

|}

Source:

Transfers

Players in

Players out 

Source:

In addition David Cochrane, David Hamill, Alex Menzies, William Muir and William Wilson all played their final 'first XI' games in Dumbarton colours.

References

Dumbarton F.C. seasons
Scottish football clubs 1911–12 season